Colledimacine is a comune and town in the province of Chieti in the Abruzzo region of south-eastern Italy.

External links 

Colledimacine: Culture, History, Genealogy

References

Cities and towns in Abruzzo